Mana Desam is a 1949 Indian Telugu-language drama film directed by L. V. Prasad. It was produced by Raja Saheb of Mirzapur under the Sobhanachala Pictures banner, and presented by Krishnaveni. It stars V. Nagayya, C. H. Narayana Rao and Krishnaveni, with music composed by Ghantasala. The film is the debut of actor N. T. Rama Rao in the film industry. It is based on the Bengali novel Vipradas by Sarat Chandra Chattopadhyay, and is set against the backdrop of the Indian independence movement.

Plot 
The story is set in 1942. Ramnath is a respectable rich man living in a village with his wife Janaki, son Nehru, brother Madhu and a doting step-mother Yasodha, who does not like Madhu's active participation in the freedom struggle, fearing that he may be jailed. Janaki's uncle, a lawyer, visits them with his city-bred daughter Sobha. She takes a liking for Madhu but is against his political leanings.

Ramnath shifts his family to Madras. Madhu is arrested for participating in the movement against British rule. A changed Sobha too jumps into the freedom struggle. Unable to trace her, the police take Ramnath into custody. An enraged Yasodha too joins the movement and goes to jail. But both are soon released. Madhu, on parole, comes home and Janaki treats him like her son. By then she is critically ill. Once the parole is over, the police come to pick him up. On seeing them, Janaki dies of shock. The police drag a deranged Madhu. After serving the sentence, Madhu, still in a mentally deranged condition, is released. Yasodha blames Ramnath for her son's plight. A dejected Ramnath leaves the house with his son. But, worried about his brother, he returns home and saves him from a fall. Dramatically, Madhu regains normality. India gets independence and the family participates in the celebrations.

Cast 
V. Nagayya as Ramnath
C. H. Narayana Rao as Madhu
Krishnaveni as Sobha
N. T. Rama Rao as British Inspector
Relangi as Constable No: 144
Vangara as Nandayya
Ramanatha Sastry as Barrat Law
Surabhi Bala Saraswati as Shobha's friend
Kanchan as Janaki
Hemalatha as Yasodha
Lakshmikantham as Narsi
Master Vijay Shankar as Nehru

Soundtrack 
The film's soundtrack is composed by Ghantasala.
 "Jaya Janani" – patriotic song, singers are Ghantasala and C. Krishnaveni
 "Emito Ee Sambhandam Enduko Ee Anubhandam" – duet, singers are M. S. Ramarao and C. Krishnaveni
 "Chalo Chalo Raja" – Singers are M. S. Ramarao and C. Krishnaveni
 "Ninnu Nenu Maruvalenura Police Yenkatsami" – rural style song, singer is Jikki Krishnaveni
 "Atta leni Kodalu Uttamuralu" – folklore song. singer is C. Kirshnaveni
 "Vedalipo Tella Dora Vedalipo" – patriotic group song..Ghantasala and C. Krishnaveni & Group.
 "Nirvedamela Kanneridela" – Gandian song by Nagayya
 "O Bharata Yuvaka" – patriotic group song..Ghantasala & Group.
 "Kallo Ninnu CHoosinane Pilla Vallu Jallumannade" – duet, singers are Ghantasala and C. Krishnaveni
 "Vaishnava Janato" – Traditional Bhajan.. Ghantasala.

References

External links 
 

1949 films
Indian drama films
Films based on Indian novels
Films scored by Ghantasala (musician)
1940s Telugu-language films
Films based on works by Sarat Chandra Chattopadhyay
Films set in the Indian independence movement
Films directed by L. V. Prasad
1949 drama films
Indian black-and-white films